Susana Aylen Clement Quezada (born August 18, 1989, in Diez de Octubre, La Habana) is a Cuban track and field athlete, who specialized in the 400 metres. She won gold medals for the national relay team at the 2009 Central American and Caribbean Championships in Havana, and also, at the 2011 Pan American Games in Guadalajara, Mexico.

Clement competed for the women's 4 × 400 m relay at the 2008 Summer Olympics in Beijing, along with her teammates Roxana Díaz, Zulia Calatayud, and Indira Terrero. She ran on the third leg of the first heat, with an individual-split time of 51.38 seconds. She and her team finished the relay in second place for a seasonal best time of 3:25.48, giving them a qualifying slot for the final round. By the following day, Clement and her team placed sixth in the finals, with a national record-breaking time of 3:23.31.

Personal best
200 m: 23.28 s (wind: +0.0 m/s) –  Camagüey, 14 March 2009
400 m: 52.24 s –  La Habana, 26 May 2007

Achievements

References

External links
 
NBC 2008 Olympics profile
Sports reference biography
Tilastopaja biography

Cuban female sprinters
Living people
Olympic athletes of Cuba
Athletes (track and field) at the 2008 Summer Olympics
Athletes (track and field) at the 2011 Pan American Games
1989 births
Pan American Games gold medalists for Cuba
Pan American Games medalists in athletics (track and field)
Medalists at the 2011 Pan American Games
Olympic female sprinters
21st-century Cuban women